Unai Elorriaga Zubiaur  (born 22 June 1980) is a Spanish professional racing cyclist. He rode at the 2015 UCI Track Cycling World Championships.

Major results

Track

2005
 1st  Points race, National Track Championships
2006
 National Track Championships
2nd Madison
3rd Scratch
2007
 National Track Championships
1st  Madison (with Aitor Alonso)
3rd Points race
2009
 National Track Championships
1st  Points race
2nd Scratch
 2008–09 UCI World Cup
1st Madison, Melbourne (with David Muntaner Juaneda)
2011
 National Track Championships
1st  Scratch
2nd Madison
3rd Points race
2012
 2011–12 UCI  World Cup
1st Overall Points race
1st Points race, Cali
 National Track Championships
3rd Points race
3rd Team pursuit
2014
 National Track Championships
2nd Scratch
2nd Team pursuit
2nd Madison
3rd Points race
2016
 National Track Championships
2nd Team pursuit
3rd Madison

Road
2002
 1st  Road race, National Under-23 Road Championships
2005
 5th Trofeo Alcudia
 6th Trofeo Mallorca
2006
 5th Overall Vuelta a la Comunidad de Madrid
1st Points classification
1st Stage 5

References

External links

1980 births
Living people
Spanish male cyclists
Cyclists from the Basque Country (autonomous community)
Sportspeople from Barakaldo
Spanish track cyclists